The men's long jump event at the 2009 Asian Athletics Championships was held at the Guangdong Olympic Stadium on November 12.

Results

References
Results

2009 Asian Athletics Championships
Long jump at the Asian Athletics Championships